Kotthoff-Weeks Farm Complex is a historic antebellum era home and farm located near Hermann, Gasconade County, Missouri. The farmhouse and barn were built between about 1850 and 1861, and are of heavy timber frame and stone buildings in the Fachwerk form. The house measures approximately 58 feet by 26 feet and features a stone chimney and fireplace.  Also on the property is the contributing log smokehouse (c. 1842).

It was listed on the National Register of Historic Places in 1983.

The complex is currently owned by the Baumstark Family of St. Louis.

References

Farms on the National Register of Historic Places in Missouri
Houses completed in 1861
Buildings and structures in Gasconade County, Missouri
National Register of Historic Places in Gasconade County, Missouri